Gonatodes timidus is a species of lizard in the Sphaerodactylidae family found in Guyana.

References

Gonatodes
Reptiles described in 2011